Kidwelly Priory was a Benedictine abbey in Kidwelly, Wales (in Welsh).

Roger, bishop of Salisbury (d.1139), a Norman invader founded the priory of Kidwelly, but it seems to have been a place of Celtic Christian veneration of Saint Cadog for some centuries prior to that.

It was a daughter abbey of Sherborne Abbey, and although well documented in the historical record it appears to have remained small for its extent. It was dissolved 1539, by Henry VIII.

Today the abbey remains a parish church, St Mary's with much of the surviving fabric dates to the fourteenth century, c. 1320.

Priors of Kidwelly
Priors of Kidwelly Medieval
 1240 Abraham   
 1268 Gervase     
 1284 Ralph de Bemenster    
 1301 Galfridus de Coker
 1346 Robert Dunster     
 1361 John Flode    
 1399 Philip Morevyle   
 1404 John de Kidwelly    
 1428 Robert Fyfhede     
 1438 John Cauntville 
 1482 John Sherborne 
 1487 John Henstrige 
 1520 John Whitchurche 
 1534 John Godmyston 
 1539 John Painter

References

Benedictine monasteries in Wales
1539 disestablishments